Various sports teams are named "the Bruins" and have a bear for a mascot.

Professional
 Boston Bruins, National Hockey League
 Chilliwack Bruins, Western Hockey League
 Providence Bruins, American Hockey League

Collegiate
 Bellevue University
 Belmont University
 Bethany University
 Bob Jones University
 Cornell University - traditional, now Big Red
 George Fox University
 Kellogg Community College
 Salt Lake Community College
 Sheridan College
 University of California, Los Angeles (UCLA)

High school
 Baldwin Senior High School (Baldwin, New York)
 Ballard High School (Louisville, Kentucky)
 Bartlesville High School (Bartlesville, Oklahoma)
 Bayshore High School (Bradenton, Florida)
 Bear Creek High School (Stockton, California)
 Bear River High School (Grass Valley, California)
 Beddingfield High School (Wilson, North Carolina)
 Bell City High School (Bell City, Louisiana)
 Belleview Christian School (Westminster, Colorado)
 Bethel High School (Hampton, Virginia)
 Blackford High School (Indiana)
 Blacksburg High School (Blacksburg, Virginia)
 Bloomington High School (Bloomington, California)
 Bolton High School (Alexandria, Louisiana) (Female Team)
 Brentwood High School (Brentwood, Tennessee)
 Britannia Secondary School (Vancouver, British Columbia)
 Broadneck High School (Arnold, Maryland)
 Brookings-Harbor High School (Brookings, Oregon)
 Cascade High School (Everett, Washington)
 Cedaredge High School (Cedaredge, Colorado)
 Central Hardin High School (Cecilia, Kentucky)
 Cherry Creek High School (Denver, Colorado)
 Columbia (White Salmon) High School (White Salmon, Washington)
 Fargo South High School (Fargo, North Dakota)
 Forest Park High School (Woodbridge, Virginia)
 Gardiner High School (Gardiner, Montana)
 Hopi High School (Keams Canyon, Arizona)
 Juneau-Douglas High School (Juneau, Alaska)
 Lancaster High School (Lancaster, South Carolina)
 Lake Braddock Secondary School (Burke, Virginia)
 Mountain View High School (Orem, Utah)
 North Bergen High School (North Bergen, New Jersey)
 Northrop High School (Fort Wayne, Indiana)
 Orangeburg Wilkinson High School (Orangeburg, South Carolina)
 Padua Franciscan High School (Parma, Ohio)
 Ponderosa High School (Shingle Springs, California)
 Pulaski Academy (Little Rock, Arkansas)
 Rock Bridge High School (Columbia, Missouri)
 Saint Bede Academy (Peru, Illinois)
 Sam Barlow High School (Gresham, Oregon)
 Santa Clara High School (Santa Clara, California)
 South Florence High School (Florence, South Carolina)
 St. Joseph Catholic School (Madison, Mississippi)
 Trevor G. Browne High School (Phoenix, Arizona)
 Tri-West Hendricks High School (Lizton, Indiana)
 Twin Falls High School (Twin Falls, Idaho)
 University School of Jackson (Jackson, Tennessee)
 Western Branch High School (Chesapeake, Virginia)
 Woodrow Wilson Classical High School (Long Beach, California)
 St. Patrick-St. Vincent High School (Vallejo, California)

Middle school
 Greenacres Middle School (Spokane Valley, Washington)
 Robert E. Howard Middle School (Orangeburg, South Carolina)
 St. Teresa of Avila School (Cincinnati, Ohio)
 Bearden Middle School (Knoxville, Tennessee) 
 Western Branch Middle School (Chesapeake, Virginia)
St. Angela Merici School (K-8) (Fairview Park, Ohio)

References

Bruin
Lists of mascots